Brunel International African Poetry Prize is a literary award aimed at the "development, celebration and promotion of poetry from Africa." The prize is sponsored by Brunel University and Bernardine Evaristo. In the past it has been partnered by Commonwealth Writers and the African Poetry Book Fund USA. It comes with a £3,000 honorarium. It is aimed at unpublished poets with a manuscript of ten poems.

The prize was founded by British-Nigerian writer Bernardine Evaristo in part to help introduce African poets to readers outside of Africa, saying "It became clear to me that poetry from the continent could also do with a prize to draw attention to it and to encourage a new generation of poets who might one day become an international presence." She has managed the prize since 2011.

Winners
2013 Warsan Shire (Somali–British)
2014 Liyou Libsekal (Ethiopia)
2015 Safia Elhillo (Sudan) and Nick Makoha (Uganda) joint-winners
2016 Gbenga Adesina (Nigeria) and Chekwube Danladi (Nigeria) joint-winners
2017 Romeo Oriogun (Nigeria) 
2018 Hiwot Adilow (Ethiopia), Theresa Lola (Nigeria), and Momtaza Mehri (Somalia) joint-winners
 2019 Nadra Mabrouk (Egypt) and Jamila Osman (Somalia) joint-winners
 2020 Rabha Ashry (Egypt)

References

External links
Brunel University African Poetry Prize, official website

African literary awards
British poetry awards
2012 establishments in England
Awards established in 2012
Literary awards honoring unpublished books or writers